Papua most commonly refers to:
 New Guinea, the world's second-largest island in the southwestern Pacific Ocean
 Western New Guinea, an Indonesian region comprising the western half of the island of New Guinea
 Papua (province), an Indonesian province in the north coast of Western New Guinea
 Papua New Guinea, a country comprising the eastern half of the island of New Guinea
 Territory of Papua (1884–1949), a British/Australian-administered territory in southeastern New Guinea
 Southern Region, Papua New Guinea, officially known as Papua Region up to 2011

Other uses
 Papua Beach, on the south Atlantic island of South Georgia
 Papua Island, off the north tip of the Antarctic Peninsula
 , a British frigate in service in the Royal Navy from 1944 to 1945

See also
 Papuan (disambiguation)
 West Papua (disambiguation)
 
 Papuasia, a bioregion containing Papua

Language and nationality disambiguation pages